"Twisted" is a 1952 vocalese song with lyrics by Annie Ross, set to a tenor saxophone solo of the same name by Wardell Gray that was recorded in 1949. It has been covered by Bette Midler, Joni Mitchell, and many others.

Background
"Twisted" is a whimsical account of the protagonist's insanity that satirises psychoanalysis. In 1952, Ross met Prestige Records owner Bob Weinstock, who asked her to write lyrics to a jazz solo, in a similar way to King Pleasure, a practice that would later be known as vocalese. The next day, she presented him with "Twisted", a treatment of saxophonist Wardell Gray's 1949 composition of the same name, a classic example of the genre. She later said of the inspiration for the song:

The song, first released in 1952 and later collected on the album King Pleasure Sings/Annie Ross Sings, was an underground hit, and resulted in her winning DownBeats New Star award. Ross released a second version with the vocalese trio Lambert, Hendricks & Ross on their 1960 album The Hottest New Group in Jazz. Gramophone described that recording as "more lighthearted, perhaps a little more individual" than Ross' first release of the song.

Covers

Joni Mitchell
Joni Mitchell recorded the song on her 1974 album Court and Spark, featuring Cheech & Chong. In a 1974 interview, when asked why she covered the song, she said: "Because I love that song, I always have loved it. I went through analysis for a while this year and the song is about analysis. I figured that I earned the right to sing it. I tried to put it on the last record [For the Roses] but it was totally inappropriate. It had nothing to do with that time period and some of my friends feel it has nothing to do with this album either. It's added like an encore."

Others
Other covers include:
Mark Murphy on his 1961 album Rah!
Bette Midler on her 1973 self-titled album
Marlena Shaw on her 1973 album Marlena Shaw Live at Montreux
Crystal Waters on her 1991 album Surprise
Jane Monheit on her 2000 album Never Never Land

The song was part of the live repertoire of the New Journeymen, before they evolved into the Mamas & the Papas.

In popular culture
The original recording of the song was used in the introduction to the 1997 Woody Allen film Deconstructing Harry.

References

Jazz songs
Songs with lyrics by Annie Ross
Annie Ross songs
Lambert, Hendricks & Ross songs
Bette Midler songs
Joni Mitchell songs
1952 songs
Patter songs